The Suga Cabinet governed Japan under the leadership of Prime Minister Yoshihide Suga from 16 September 2020 to 4 October 2021. The government was a coalition between the Liberal Democratic Party and the Komeito and controlled both the upper and lower houses of the National Diet.

Following his resignation, the Suga cabinet was dissolved on October 4, 2021, and replaced with the First Kishida Cabinet after being in office for 384 days.

Election of the Prime Minister

Lists of Ministers 

R = Member of the House of Representatives
C = Member of the House of Councillors
B = Bureaucrat

Cabinet

Deputy Chief Cabinet Secretary and Director-General of the Cabinet Legislation Bureau

Special Adviser to the Prime Minister

References

External links 
List of Ministers September 2020 – October 2021

Cabinet of Japan
2020 establishments in Japan
2021 establishments in Japan
Cabinets established in 2020
Cabinets disestablished in 2021
2020 in Japanese politics
Yoshihide Suga